The Pentaverate is a Canadian comedy streaming television miniseries created by Mike Myers for Netflix, inspired by conspiracy theories from his 1993 film So I Married an Axe Murderer. The series premiered on May 5, 2022, and consists of six episodes.

Premise
Since the 1347 outbreak of Black Death, five men have been working to influence world events for the greater good. One unlikely Canadian journalist finds himself in the middle of a mission to expose the truth behind the secret society and, in the process, saves the world.

Cast
 Mike Myers as:
Ken Scarborough: Canadian TV journalist attempting to expose the Pentaverate and win back his network news job 
Anthony Lansdowne: New England conspiracy theorist determined to expose the Pentaverate
Rex Smith: popular far-right radio host and prominent conspiracy theorist
Lord Lordington: oldest and highest-ranking member of the Pentaverate, seated at the dais as "Centralis"
Bruce Baldwin: Pentaverate member and former Australian media mogul
Mishu Ivanov: Pentaverate member and former Russian oligarch
Shep Gordon: Pentaverate member and rock music mogul (subject of the documentary Supermensch: The Legend of Shep Gordon, directed by Myers)
Jason Eccleston: tech genius who invented the Pentaverate supercomputer AI, MENTOR
 Ken Jeong as Skip Cho: casino mogul with extensive knowledge in the chaos theory of weather patterns 
 Keegan-Michael Key as Dr. Hobart Clark: Pentaverate initiate, a nuclear physicist hoping to resolve climate change disaster
 Debi Mazar as Patty Davis: trusted Executive Assistant to the Pentaverate
 Richard McCabe as Exalted Pikeman Higgins: head of the Pentaverate security force, the Liechtenstein Guard
 Jennifer Saunders as:
The Maester of Dubrovnik: head investigator to the Pentaverate, summoned from his ancestral home in Dubrovnik to investigate a suspicious death
The Saester of Dubrovnik: sister of the Maester and protector of the parce clavem, the spare key for the Pentaverate voting apparatus
 Lydia West as Reilly Clayton: accomplice to Ken Scarborough
 Neil Mullarkey as the mysterious mustached man

Rob Lowe and Maria Menounos appear as fictionalized versions of themselves. Tanya Moodie plays Mrs. Snee, Ken's boss at his TV network. Myers briefly reprised his voice role as Shrek from the film series of the same name, who appears as a walk-around character that saves Ken. Jeremy Irons narrates the opening titles.

Episodes

Production

Development 
On April 17, 2019, it was announced that Mike Myers would create and star in an untitled Netflix comedy. Myers also executive produces along with John Lyons and Jason Weinberg. In June 2021, the series' title was announced as The Pentaverate, based on the conspiracy theories from the 1993 film So I Married an Axe Murderer, which stars Myers as both poet Charlie McKenzie and his Scottish-born father, Stuart McKenzie, who explains the nature & membership of the group in that film. Tim Kirkby joined as director and executive producer, with Tony Hernandez and Lilly Burns also joining as executive producers. In January 2020, Ed Dyson and Roger Drew came on board as co-writers and executive producers. This marked Myers' first starring live-action role since his critically panned romantic comedy The Love Guru from 2008. In early March 2022, Myers opened up an Instagram account posting images relating to the namesake of the series, five days prior to the trailer debut.

Myers has stated that the character Ken Scarborough was a tribute to Canadian local news reporter and print columnist Glenn Cochrane. Scarborough's character was inspired by Cochrane's accent, hairstyle, and polite manner. In Myers' 2017 memoir Canada, he recalls while growing up in Scarborough, Ontario, hearing Cochrane reporting at a sportsmen's show similar to the one depicted in the opening episode. Cochrane reported for CFTO News for 25 years before he passed away in June 2012.

For the inclusion of the Shrek character, Myers contacted Jeffrey Katzenberg and DreamWorks Animation for permission. Katzenberg happily agreed to have Myers include Shrek in the mini-series due to the actor's relationship with the studio.

Themes 
One of the themes Myers wanted to explore was conspiracy theories. Conspiracy theories and confusion about their degrees of truth recur throughout the show. For example, the Pentavarate's headquarters includes a lunar stage that seems to confirm the faked US moon landing conspiracy theory. Myers stated at the "Netflix is a Joke" Comedy Festival:"I really wanted to dedicate this show to local journalists, because right now in this global war between fascism and democracy, you know, the first casualty of war is truth. Getting rid of local news is just the beginning of a slippery slope of all unfalsifiable fact."

Casting 
On June 8, 2021, in addition to Myers himself, Ken Jeong, Keegan-Michael Key, Debi Mazar, Richard McCabe, Jennifer Saunders, and Lydia West were cast. Mazar previously co-starred with Myers in So I Married an Axe Murderer as Tony Giradino's girlfriend, Susan. On March 16, 2022, Jeremy Irons was announced as the series narrator. On April 28, both Rob Lowe and Maria Menounos were announced to be playing fictional versions of themselves.

Filming 
Filming began in late May 2021 and wrapped filming in late July 2021.
Interior scenes were filmed in the newly opened Troubadour Meridian Water Studios in Enfield, North London.

Some interior scenes for the location The Meadows were filmed at Freemasons Hall, London, which is the headquarters of The United Grand Lodge of England, which is the governing Masonic lodge for the majority of freemasons in England, Wales and the Commonwealth of Nations.

Music 
The soundtrack for the series was composed and recorded by the British electronic duo Orbital. A portion of their 1996 single "The Box" was used as the show's opening theme. The Smash Mouth cover of the song "I'm a Believer", originally by the Monkees, briefly appears in a scene featuring Shrek in reference to its role as part of the film.

Release 
All six episodes of the series were released on Netflix on May 5, 2022.

Reception

The review aggregator website Rotten Tomatoes reported a 28% critic approval rating from all critics and a 56% rating from top critics, with an average rating of 4.9/10, based on 25 critic reviews.  The website's critics consensus reads, "After a long absence from the screen, Mike Myers returns with an overstuffed farce wherein he plays eight different characters—but unfortunately, almost none of them are funny." On average, top critics reviewed the series slightly more favorably. Robert Levin of Newsday wrote, "The Pentavarate is simultaneously silly and pointless, and a welcome return to form from its star." Metacritic gave the series a weighted average score of 44 out of 100 based on 12 critics, indicating "mixed or average reviews".

References

External links 
 
 

2020s American comedy television series
2020s American television miniseries
2022 American television series debuts
2022 American television series endings
English-language Netflix original programming
Live action television shows based on films
Television series about cults
Works by Mike Myers